Sir James Edward Parrott, MP, (1 June 1863 – 5 April 1921) was a British teacher and author, who served as the Liberal Member of Parliament for Edinburgh South for 1917–1918.

Life

He was born in Marple, Cheshire, the eldest son of a schoolteacher. He was educated at St. Paul's College, Cheltenham and then became an elementary schoolteacher, studying for a MA degree at Trinity College, Dublin at the same time. In 1891, he married Elizabeth Shirley, with whom he had three daughters; she later became the Inspectress of Schools in Liverpool.  He worked in education in Sheffield and then Liverpool for several years, during which time he began to write schoolbooks; as a result of this work, he was appointed educational editor at Thomas Nelson & Sons in 1898, and moved to Edinburgh. In 1900, he was awarded the degree of LLD by Trinity College, Dublin, ranked at the head of the examination list.

He was elected chairman of the South Edinburgh Liberal Association in 1904 (until 1917), and the chair of Edinburgh United Liberal Committee in 1908 (until 1919). He was knighted in 1910 for services to the Liberal Party.

In 1917, the Member of Parliament for Edinburgh South, Charles Henry Lyell, stood down. Parrott was offered the candidacy by the local Liberal Association in April, and accepted it; it had previously been expected that the seat would be offered to Sir George Macrae. In the by-election on 12 May, he was returned unopposed. He did not contest the seat at the 1918 general election, and instead stood for election in Edinburgh West but lost to the elected Conservative. He remained loyal to H. H. Asquith in the post-war split of the Liberal Party, considering himself a "Gladstonian Liberal".

He was a Governor of Cheltenham Training College, and a Justice of the Peace for the City of Edinburgh. For his work with Belgian and Serbian refugees during the First World War, he received the Belgian Order of the Crown with Palms in Gold, and was an Officer of the Serbian Order of St. Sava.

He died in April 1921 aged 57 and is buried with his wife and daughters in Grange Cemetery in southern Edinburgh, facing north onto the southern path.

Publications

His publications included various books on the First World War and a large number of schoolbooks, and he edited Funk and Wagnall's Standard Encyclopaedia and Nelson's New Age Encyclopaedia.

Notes

References
 "PARROTT, Sir (James) Edward", in 
 Obituary in The Times, 6 April 1921, p. 13

External links 
 
 
 
 

1863 births
1921 deaths
Scottish Liberal Party MPs
Members of the Parliament of the United Kingdom for Scottish constituencies
UK MPs 1910–1918
Alumni of Trinity College Dublin
People from Marple, Greater Manchester
Recipients of the Order of the Crown (Belgium)
Officers of the Order of St. Sava
Members of the Parliament of the United Kingdom for Edinburgh constituencies
Burials in Scotland